Anthea Alley (1927–1993) was a British sculptor and artist.

She was born in Malaya in 1927, and lived in Australia and South Africa during the Second World War. In 1944 she moved to London with her family and studied painting at the Regent Street Polytechnic, Chelsea College of Art and the Royal College of Art. From 1957 she concentrated on sculpture art, producing welded pieces alongside assemblage paintings. In 1960, Alley held her first one-person show at the Molton Gallery and in 1961 she received a John Moores Painting Prize.

She was married to Ronald Alley, Keeper of the Modern Collection at the Tate Gallery, London.

Examples of her work is in the permanent collection of the Tate Gallery, the Arts Council and Birmingham Art Gallery.

References

External links

1927 births
1993 deaths
20th-century British artists
20th-century British women artists
Alumni of Chelsea College of Arts
Alumni of the Royal College of Art
Alumni of the University of Westminster
British women sculptors